Robert Ames may refer to:

Robert Ames (actor) (1889–1931), American stage and film actor
Robert Ames (CIA official) (1934–1983), American CIA analyst, a/k/a Bob Ames
Robert Ames (conductor) (born 1985), English conductor and violist
Bob Ames (naval architect), American sailboat designer (1992 Vanguard 15)